Lanes Pond is a swamp in the U.S. state of Georgia.

The pond was named after Mills B. Lane III, the original owner of the site. A variant name is "Lane Pond".

References

Swamps of Georgia (U.S. state)
Bodies of water of Lowndes County, Georgia